The Ghomara language is a Northern Berber language spoken in Morocco. It is the mother tongue of the Ghomara Berbers, who total around 10,000 people. Ghomara Berber is spoken on the western edge of the Rif, among the Beni Bu Zra and Beni Mansur tribes of the Ghomara confederacy. Despite being listed as endangered, it is still being passed on to children in these areas.

Ghomara Berber is relatively similar to Senhadja de Srair Berber spoken around Ketama. However, it is difficult to understand for a speaker of Rifian.

Some typical features that distinguish the Ghomara variety of Berber from Rifian Berber are the use of the preposition dar instead of the Rifian ghar, the feminine plural ending -an instead of -in, and the absence of spirantisation in word-initial position.

Current status
Although elderly Ghomara teach children how to speak Ghomara Berber at home, the language is still considered threatened, with only 10,000 known speakers. A major reason can be attributed to the small geographical location where this language is used, as well as the more common usage of Moroccan Arabic throughout Morocco.

Phonology

Vowels
Like Arabic, Ghomara and the other Berber dialects have three vowels: a-, i-, u-.

Consonants 
Ghomara has 44 consonants, and most consonants in Ghomara have geminated forms.

Grammar

Nouns
For nouns in Ghomara Berber, there are several common trends. The prefix a-, i-, or u- commonly identifies the masculine singular nouns in the language (i.e., arg'az “man”). For feminine singular nouns, there is both a prefix and a suffix such as ta-...-t (i.e., tarbat “girl”). This is the most common way to identify feminine singular nouns. Masculine plural nouns are characterized by i-...-en or i-...-an (i.e., irg'azen “men”). For feminine plural nouns, ti-...-an (i.e., tirbatan “girls”) is the most common circumfix.

Pronouns
Ghomara Berber uses personal, singular, and plural pronouns.

The first person singular pronoun nekkin is equivalent to "I" in English. The second person singular male pronoun kedžin and female pronoun kemmin is equivalent to "you" in English. Similarly, in Ghomara Berber, the third person singular male pronoun netta and female pronoun nettaθa is equivalent to him or her in English respectively.

The first person plural pronoun nuçna is equivalent to "we" in English and the second person plural pronoun kunna is equivalent to "you all" in English. Lastly, niçma is the third person plural pronoun equivalent to "they" in English, and is not distinguished by gender.

Verbs
In Ghomara Berber verbs contain certain affixes that characterize singularity, plurality, and point of view (POV). The following is an example of the verb conjugations for the English word "to write" or ara in Ghomara Berber:

Adjectives
Adjectives have either suffix -ø, which characterizes masculine singular nouns or -θ, which characterizes both feminine singular and all plural nouns. For example:
Masculine singular: tayfur mellulø “the, a white table”
Feminine singular: tamɣart mezziθ “the, a little woman”
Masculine plural: irgazen muqqreθ “(the) big men”
Feminine plural: timettutan muqqreθ “(the) big women”

Vocabulary
An example of common English words in Ghomara Berber:
targat: “dream”
ahlan: “welcome, hello” 
hemmam: “bathroom” 
tamuda: “pig"
lmakla: “food” 
tanebdut: “summer”
kama: “bed” (borrowed from Spanish)

Numbers
Ghomara Berber uses a numerical system similar to many other languages. Cardinal numbers yan (“one”, masculine) and yat (“one”, feminine) are the only Berber numerals in Ghomara, while all the other cardinal numbers are borrowed from Moroccan Arabic (zuž (“two”), tlata (“three”), ɛišrin  (“twenty”), tlatin (“thirty”), etc.).

References

Further reading
 
 
 Gabriel Camps and J. Vignet-Zunz. 1998. Ghomâra (Ghumara, Ghmara). In Gabriel Camps (ed.), Encyclopédie berbère: Gauda - Girrei, 3110–3119. Aix-en-Provence: Edisud.
 Colin, Georges S. 1929. Le parler berbère des Ġmāra. Hespéris: (pp. 43–58) archives berbères et bulletin de l'Institut des Hautes Etudes Marocaines.
  (contains much discussion of Ghomara Berber based on Mourigh's materials).

Berber languages
Languages of Morocco